Rhys Carpenter (August 5, 1889 – January 2, 1980) was an American classical art historian and professor at Bryn Mawr College.

Carpenter was unconventional as a scholar. He analyzed Greek art from the standpoint of artistic production and behavior. He argued for dating the Greek alphabet to the eighth century B.C.

Early life and career 
Carpenter was born in Cotuit, Massachusetts in 1889. He received his B.A. in Classics from Columbia University in 1909. Carpenter won a Rhodes scholarship at the University of Oxford, studying at Balliol College. There he published his own poetry and earned a second B.A. (1911), upgraded to an M.A. in 1914.

He spent the year 1912–13 at the American School of Classical Studies in Athens. The president of Bryn Mawr College, Martha Carey Thomas (1857–1935) invited Carpenter to establish a department of classical archaeology at the college, which he did while completing his own graduate work at Columbia University; he completed his Ph.D. in 1916 with a dissertation on The Ethics of Euripides.

By 1918 he was already a full professor at Bryn Mawr. In 1918 Carpenter married Eleanor Houston Hill. In 1926 Carpenter became professor at the American School of Classical Studies in Athens, and established the school's journal, Hesperia in 1932. He also was instrumental in the planning of the American excavations of the agora in Athens. He returned to teaching at Bryn Mawr College and also delivered the Martin Classical Lectures at Oberlin College, which appeared in print as The Humanistic Value of Archaeology (1933). He delivered the Sather lectures in 1946 on "Folk tale, fiction, and saga in the Homeric epics."

Retirement 
Carpenter retired in 1955. In his retirement he held visiting professorships at the University of Pennsylvania (1960), was Andrew W. Mellon professor at the University of Pittsburgh (1961–62), and visiting scholar at the University of Washington (1963–64). He was awarded the Gold Medal of the Archaeological Institute of America in 1969.

Dr. Carpenter, one year before his death, was forced from his estate "Jerry Run" by the government so Marsh Creek State Park lake could be built.

Death 
He died in Devon, Pennsylvania in 1980.

Legacy 
Bryn Mawr College dedicated their newly built archaeology library in Carpenter's name and memory in 1997.

Bibliography
 [bibliography to 1969]:  Hesperia 38 no. 2 (1969) : 123–132.
 Greek Sculpture: a Critical Review. Chicago: University of Chicago Press, 1960.
 and Ackerman, James. Art and Archaeology. New York: Prentice Hall, 1963.
 Humanistic Value of Archaeology. Cambridge, MA: Harvard University Press, 1933.
 The Esthetic Basis of the Greek Art of the Fifth and Fourth Centuries B.C.. New York:  Longmans, Green and Co., 1921, 2nd ed.: Bloomington, IN: Indiana University Press, 1959.
 Ancient Corinth: a guide to the excavations. Athens: Hestia, 1936.
 Art; a Bryn Mawr Symposium. Bryn Mawr, PA: Bryn Mawr College, 1940.
 Discontinuity in Greek Civilization. Cambridge: Cambridge University Press, 1966.
 Folk Tale: Fiction and Saga in the Homeric Epics. Berkeley: University of California Press, 1946.
 The Greeks in Spain. New York:  Longmans, Green and Co., 1925.
 Historical Aspects of the Fine Arts: Addresses by Rhys Carpenter [and others]. Oberlin, OH: Oberlin College, 1938.
 The Sun-Thief, and Other Poems. London:  H. Milford, 1914.

Notes

References
 For Carpenter's full bibliography, see Hesperia 38 (1969) 123–32.
 For his obituary, see Machteld Mellink in American Journal of Archaeology 84, No. 2 (Apr., 1980), pp. 260–1.
 Kleinbauer, W. Eugene. Research Guide to the History of Western Art. Sources of Information in the Humanities, no. 2. Chicago:  American Library Association, 1982, p. 43.
 Kleinbauer, W. Eugene. Modern Perspectives in Western Art History:  An Anthology of 20th-Century Writings on the Visual Arts. New York:  Holt, Rinehart and Winston, 1971, p. 40.
 Medwid, Linda M. The Makers of Classical Archaeology:  A Reference Work. New York:  Humanity Books, 2000 pp. 48–51.
 Mabel Lang  "Rhys Carpenter."  American National Biography 4: 433–34.
 Mortimer Chambers "Rhys Carpenter." Encyclopedia of the History of Classical Archaeology. Nancy Thomson de Grummond, ed. Westport, CT:  Greenwood Press, 1996, pp. 245–46.
 [Obituary:] New York Times, January 4, 1980: 15.

External links
 
 Breaking Ground, Breaking Tradition: Bryn Mawr and the First Generation of Women Archaeologists

Classical archaeologists
1889 births
1980 deaths
Classical scholars of Bryn Mawr College
American expatriates in Greece
American Rhodes Scholars
Columbia College (New York) alumni
People from Cotuit, Massachusetts
20th-century American archaeologists